is a Japanese television jidaigeki or period drama that was broadcast in 1986. It is the 26th in the Hissatsu series. Inspired by Video game Super Mario Bros.

Cast 
 Kunihiko Mitamura as Hide
 Yoko Akino as Keima no Ogin
 Shōfukutei Tsurube II as Ayamaro
 Teruhiko Saigō as Toukichi
 Mikio Osawa as Sabu
 Masako Sugawara as Wakamurasaki
 Gorō Mutsumi as Kagurazaka Soemon
 Jūkei Fujioka as Mukojima Jinjurō

References

1986 Japanese television series debuts
1980s drama television series
Jidaigeki television series